Bonwick is a surname. Notable people with the surname include:

Alfred Bonwick (1883–1949), British politician
James Bonwick (1817–1906), English-born Australian writer
Jeff Bonwick, American computer scientist
Paul Bonwick (born 1964), Canadian politician
Simon Bonwick (born 1969), British chef

See also
Bonwick Island, an island of British Columbia, Canada